Temba Bavuma (born 17 May 1990) is a South African international cricketer who is the current captain of the South African cricket team in Tests and ODI cricket, and formerly captained in T20I. He is a right-handed batter and was the first black African cricketer to make a Test century for South Africa and the first to captain the side. Bavuma is one of three South African cricketers to score a century on ODI debut, scoring 113 runs against Ireland in September 2016.

Early life
Brought up in the intense cricket culture of Langa – Bavuma, Thami Tsolekile and Malusi Siboto are all from the same street – Bavuma was educated at South African College Junior School in Newlands, and St David's Marist Inanda, a boys high School in Sandton.

Domestic career
Bavuma made his debut in 2008 in Gauteng against Eastern Province. Batting in the middle order, he made four runs in the first innings in which he batted, briefly partnering teammate Dane Vilas to his first-class best score.

Bavuma made his franchise debut for the Lions in the 2010/11 season. In the Supersport Series, he made 242 runs in 4 matches at an average of 60.50 in this first season, including a score of 124 not out against the Knights, which earned him a man of the match. In his second Supersport season in 2011/12, he made 637 runs at an average of 53.08. This was enough for him to place 11th in the top run scorers. In 2012/13, he was the 5th highest scorer in the now renamed Sunfoil Series, but at a poorer average of 31.58. In 2013/14, he again scored heavily making 714 runs at an average of 39.66, seeing him place 6th on the Sunfoil Series scorers list. For his franchise, he has an unusually high conversion rate of 50s to 100s, scoring six 100s and five 50s in Supersport and Sunfoil series cricket.

These performances have earned him five matches so far for the South Africa A cricket team. The first was in July 2012 against Sri Lanka A in Durban. He also played a match against Ireland in the A side's tour of the country in August of that year. He did not make a significant contribution in either of those two matches. His next appearances for the A side were in the series of matches played in South Africa between South Africa A and the Indian and Australian A sides. He faced Australia once, and India twice. His best performance was a 65 in the second match of an innings defeat against the Indians. He was included in the Gauteng squad for the 2015 Africa T20 Cup.

In May 2017, Bavuma announced that he was switching franchises to join Cape Cobras ahead of the 2017–18 season. In June 2018, Bavuma was made captain of the Highveld Lions across all formats. In September 2018, he was named in Gauteng's squad for the 2018 Africa T20 Cup. The following month, he was named in Durban Heat's squad for the first edition of the Mzansi Super League T20 tournament. In September 2019, he was named in the squad for the Jozi Stars team for the 2019 Mzansi Super League tournament. In April 2021, he was named in Gauteng's squad, ahead of the 2021–22 cricket season in South Africa.

In September 2022, Bavuma wasn't picked by any franchise in the auction for the first edition of the SA20 League.

International career
Bavuma made his Test debut for South Africa against the West Indies on 26 December 2014.

On 5 January 2016, Bavuma became the first black cricketer to score a Test century for South Africa. He scored an unbeaten 102 at the Cape Town in the 2nd Test of the 2015/16 series against England.

Bavuma made his One Day International debut for South Africa against Ireland on 25 September 2016 and scored his maiden ODI century. He opened the batting with Quinton de Kock, standing in for Hashim Amla who was attending the birth of his child. Bavuma was named player of the match for his performance and was the second player to score a century on their ODI debut for South Africa.

Bavuma took his first and only Test wicket against Australia on 7 November 2016.

In May 2017, Bavuma won the Award of Excellence at Cricket South Africa's annual awards.

In August 2019, Bavuma was named in South Africa's Twenty20 International (T20I) squad for their series against India. He made his T20I debut for South Africa, against India, on 18 September 2019.

Captaincy, 2021–present 

On 4 March 2021, Bavuma was named as the captain of South Africa's limited over side, taking over the captaincy from Quinton de Kock. With the appointment of him as South Africa's permanent captain, he became the first ever black African player to be appointed as the permanent captain of South Africa's side. Bavuma's first series as captain was a home series against Pakistan. He sustained a hamstring injury in the third ODI and as a result missed the T20I portion of the series.

On 24 July 2021, against Ireland in the third T20I, Bavuma scored his maiden T20I half-century, scoring 72 off 51 deliveries before being dismissed by Barry McCarthy. In September, South Africa toured Sri Lanka for three ODIs and three T20Is; in the opening match sustained an injury to his right thumb while batting and retired hurt. The injury required surgery, but Bavuma recovered sufficiently to captain South Africa's squad at the 2021 ICC Men's T20 World Cup in October. South Africa won four out of their five matches but were eliminated in the group stage based on net run rate.

South Africa toured India in June 2022 for five T20Is. South Africa drew the series, but Bavuma sustained an elbow injury in the fourth match and missed South Africa's tour of England later that year. Leading into the 2022 ICC Men's T20 World Cup in October and November, sports journalist Katya Witney writing for Wisden observed that Bavuma was out of form. She suggested that "what Bavuma brings to the side should not be wholly dependent on his batting statistics. His skills and role as captain should not be overlooked lightly." In a second tour of India that year, preceding the T20 World Cup, Bavuma scored eight runs across four innings in T20Is and ODIs, amidst a tour disrupted by illness, with Bavuma missing the final two ODIs. Bavuma led South Africa at the 2022 ICC Men's T20 World Cup.

References

External links

 

1990 births
Living people
Xhosa people
People from Langa, Western Cape
Cricketers from the Western Cape
South African cricketers
South Africa Test cricketers
South Africa One Day International cricketers
South Africa Twenty20 International cricketers
Cricketers who made a century on One Day International debut
Gauteng cricketers
Lions cricketers
Cape Cobras cricketers
Durban Heat cricketers
Northamptonshire cricketers
Jozi Stars cricketers